Richard Brooks (born 18 August 1965) is a British investigative journalist and former tax inspector. He writes principally for Private Eye, is the author of books on accountancy and tax avoidance, and was a 16-year senior corporate tax inspector for HMRC. He is the joint winner of two Paul Foot Awards, an annual award for investigative or campaigning journalism.

Career

Brooks worked as a HM Revenue and Customs tax inspector for 16 years up until 2005 specialising in international and corporate taxation.

Since 2005, he has been a regular contributor to Private Eye. In 2008 Brooks was joint-winner of the Paul Foot Award for his investigation into the privatisation of the CDC Group. He is the author of The Great Tax Robbery: How Britain Became a Tax Haven for Fat Cats and Big Business (2013) and the co-author (with David Craig) of Plundering the Public Sector: How New Labour are letting consultants run off with £70 billion of our money (2006). With Andrew Bousfield, he was joint-winner again of the Paul Foot Award in 2014 for their investigations in Private Eye on bribery inShady Arabia and the Desert Fix. In 2018 Brooks published a new book, Bean Counters: The Triumph of Accountants and how they broke Capitalism.

In January 2022, Brooks alongside Ian Hislop and Solomon Hughes presented evidence on MPs' conduct to the House of Commons' Standards Committee

Bibliography

See also
Corporate tax haven
Base erosion and profit shifting
Feargal O'Rourke
Tax Justice Network
Matheson (law firm)
Ireland as a tax haven

References

External links
 Richard Brooks: Guardian

British investigative journalists
Private Eye contributors
Living people
Civil servants in HM Revenue and Customs
Writers on taxation
The Guardian journalists
British business writers
1965 births